Verne James McCaul (August 18, 1903—March 2, 1968) was a lieutenant general in the United States Marine Corps who served as the Director of Aviation and the 7th Assistant Commandant of the Marine Corps.

Early years
McCaul was born on August 18, 1903, in Ayr, North Dakota, and after joining the Marine Corps participated in World War II.  He was commissioned in 1925 and subsequently became a naval aviator.

Major McCaul established Marine Fighting Squadron 221 at San Diego in 1941 and took the unit to Midway Island by year end.  On Midway, he joined the staff of Marine Air Group 22, then returned to the U.S.  He saw additional Pacific service in the Solomon Islands and the Philippines, where he assumed command of Marine Air Group 12 in early 1945.

After the war, McCaul was promoted to brigadier general, serving in USMC Headquarters.  Subsequently, he commanded the 1st and 2nd Marine Aircraft Wings and in 1957 he became the Director of Aviation.

By the time McCaul retired in 1960, he had achieved the rank of lieutenant general. He died on March 2, 1968, at the U.S. Naval Hospital in San Diego, California.

Awards and decorations 
During his military career, he was awarded: Legion of Merit with Combat "V" and Gold Star in lieu of a second award, Presidential Unit Citation with one bronze star in lieu of a second award, the Navy Unit Commendation, the American Defense Service Medal with Base clasp, the Asiatic-Pacific Campaign Medal with three bronze stars, the American Campaign Medal, the World War II Victory Medal, the China Service Medal, the National Defense Service Medal, the Korean Service Medal, the United Nations Service Medal, the Philippine Liberation Ribbon with one bronze star, and the Chinese Order of the Cloud and Banner.

See also 

 List of 1st Marine Aircraft Wing commanders

References

1903 births
1968 deaths
United States Marine Corps generals
United States Naval Aviators
United States Marine Corps personnel of World War II
United States Marine Corps personnel of the Korean War
Recipients of the Legion of Merit
People from Cass County, North Dakota
North Dakota State University alumni
National War College alumni
Burials at Fort Rosecrans National Cemetery